The 1994–95 Australian region cyclone season was a below average Australian cyclone season. It was also an event in the ongoing cycle of tropical cyclone formation. It ran from 1 November 1994 to 30 April 1995. The regional tropical cyclone operational plan also defines a tropical cyclone year separately from a tropical cyclone season, and the "tropical cyclone year" ran from 1 July 1994 to 30 June 1995.

Tropical cyclones in this area were monitored by four Tropical Cyclone Warning Centres (TCWCs): the Australian Bureau of Meteorology in Perth, Darwin, and Brisbane; and TCWC Port Moresby in Papua New Guinea.

Systems

Severe Tropical Cyclone Annette 

Annette formed on 12 December 1994. The storm moved southeastward while intensifying to a Category 4 cyclone. Annette made landfall at Mandora Station on 18 December. There was considerable damage to homes and crops and about 1,000 cattle were lost in the storm.

Tropical Low Heida 

Tropical Low Heida developed on 3 February and exited the basin on the next day.

Severe Tropical Cyclone Bobby 

Severe Tropical Cyclone Bobby, a Category 4 cyclone with estimated winds up to 270 km/hour near the centre, crossed the Western Australian Pilbara coast to the east of Onslow between midnight and 0100 on the 25 February 1995. Seven people died when two fishing trawlers were sunk off the coast from Onslow. A bulk ore carrier also ran aground in the cyclone. There was very minor property damage reported from the Karratha area and approximately 20 houses in Onslow suffered superficial roofing damage. Cyclone Bobby also brought heavy rains and extensive flooding to the south of the Pilbara area, which damaged roads, bridges and crops and seriously affected mining production. A motorist was drowned inland from Carnarvon while attempting to cross a flooded creek.

Severe Tropical Cyclone Violet 

During the afternoon of 2 March a tropical low formed over the Coral Sea. The low moved south-westwards and proceeded to deepen, becoming a Category 1 Tropical Cyclone on 3 March, being named Violet. During the afternoon of 5 March, Violet turned south-eastwards and continued to intensify, up until its peak intensity of 150 km/h winds and a central pressure of 960 hPa as a Category 3 severe Tropical Cyclone. Violet then weakened slowly as it turned to a south-westwards direction during the evening of 6 March. During the next day, Violet began a transition into a deep extratropical low, with a central pressure of 980 hPa.

The low made its closest approach to the coast on the 7 March, passing 50 km off the northern New South Wales coast. The low proceeded to do a loop towards the southeast before dissipating on the 8 March. The only report of damage from Violet was beach erosion at Lord Howe Island and around northern New South Wales.

Severe Tropical Cyclone Warren 

On 4 March a tropical low had developed in the Gulf of Carpentaria. The low proceeded to move southwards and started to intensify, quickly becoming a category 1 tropical cyclone later the same day, being named Warren. Warren then turned in a south-western direction and proceeded to rapidly intensify, reaching category 1 hurricane strength on the 5 March just north of Mornington Island on the 5 March. Warren reached peak intensity with mean winds of 140 Kilometers per Hour and a central pressure of 960 hPa 6 hours later. Warren made landfall near the southern coast of the Gulf of Carpentaria and weakened rapidly as it moved inland, eventually dissipating near the Queensland-Northern Territory border on the 6 March.

Severe Tropical Cyclone Chloe 

The third major cyclone to strike Australia in the season, Severe Tropical Cyclone Chloe reached a peak intensity of Category 5, before weakening slightly to Category 4 prior to making landfall in the uninhabited section of the coast of the Kimberley region of Western Australia on 7 April 1995. The storm dissipated well inland.

Tropical Depression 20P 

Tropical Depression 20P existed from 1 April to 6 April.

Severe Tropical Cyclone Agnes 

During the evening of 16 April, a tropical low formed near Papua New Guinea in the Gulf of Papua. The low started intensifying rapidly, becoming a category 1 tropical cyclone early on 17 April, being named Agnes. Agnes then moved around erratically over the next few days, eventually reaching peak intensity as a Category 4 severe tropical cyclone, with wind gusts of 165 km/h and a central pressure of 945 hPa. Agnes proceeded to weaken, becoming a tropical low on the 22 April before dissipating late that day.

Season effects 

|-
| Annette ||  || bgcolor=#|Category 4 severe tropical cyclone || bgcolor=#| || bgcolor=#| || Western Australia || Minor || Minor || None ||
|-
| Heida ||  || bgcolor=#|Tropical Low || bgcolor=#| || bgcolor=#| || None || None || None || None ||
|-
| Bobby ||  || bgcolor=#|Category 4 severe tropical cyclone || bgcolor=#| || bgcolor=#| || Northern Territory, Western Australia || $11,000,000 || $8,500,000 || 8 ||
|-
| Violet ||  || bgcolor=#|Category 3 severe tropical cyclone || bgcolor=#| || bgcolor=#| || Queensland || None || None || None ||
|-
| Warren ||  || bgcolor=#|Category 3 severe tropical cyclone || bgcolor=#| || bgcolor=#| || Queensland, Northern Territory || None || None || None ||
|-
| Chloe ||  || bgcolor=#|Category 5 severe tropical cyclone || bgcolor=#| || bgcolor=#| || Northern Territory, Western Australia || None || None || None ||
|-
| 20P ||  || bgcolor=#|Tropical Depression || bgcolor=#| || bgcolor=#| || None || None || None || None ||
|-
| Agnes ||  || bgcolor=#|Category 4 severe tropical cyclone || bgcolor=#| || bgcolor=#| || Papua New Guinea || None || None || None ||
|-

See also 

 List of Southern Hemisphere tropical cyclone seasons
 Atlantic hurricane seasons: 1994, 1995
 Pacific hurricane seasons: 1994, 1995
 Pacific typhoon seasons: 1994, 1995
 North Indian Ocean cyclone seasons: 1994, 1995

References 

 
Australian region cyclone seasons